Dr. Sukanta Kumar Majumdar is an Indian politician. He was elected to the Lok Sabha, lower house of the Parliament of India from Balurghat, West Bengal in the 2019 Indian general election. Currently, he is the 10th state president of Bharatiya Janata Party, West Bengal. He has done his PhD in Botany from the University of North Bengal. He is a professor of Botany at the University of Gour Banga. He was nominated as the Chief of West Bengal BJP on 20 September 2021. He was appointed as President of Bharatiya Janata Party, West Bengal on 20 September 2021, replacing Dilip Ghosh.

References

External links
Official biographical sketch in Parliament of India website

India MPs 2019–present
Lok Sabha members from West Bengal
Living people
Bharatiya Janata Party politicians from West Bengal
1979 births
People from Balurghat
Bengali Hindus
University of North Bengal alumni